Laurence Paul Fox (born 1978) is an actor, musician and political activist. A member of the entertainment industry's Fox family, he graduated from the Royal Academy of Dramatic Art and debuted in the film The Hole (2001). His best known role is James Hathaway in the drama series Lewis (2006–2015). He has also released a studio album titled Holding Patterns (2016).

A conservative, Fox publicly spoke out against the George Floyd protests and COVID-19 vaccines in 2020. After founding the right-wing populist political party Reclaim, he stood unsuccessfully in the 2021 London mayoral election in opposition to what he deemed "extreme political correctness". He gained 1.9% of the vote, thus losing his election deposit.

Early life
Laurence Paul Fox was born into the Fox family in Leeds in 1978, the son of Mary Elizabeth Piper and actor James Fox. His paternal grandfather was talent agent Robin Fox and his paternal grandmother was actress Angela Worthington, whose father was playwright Frederick Lonsdale. He has two older brothers named Tom and Robin, a younger sister named Lydia, and a younger brother named Jack. Robin is a film producer, while Lydia and Jack are actors; Lydia is married to comedian and filmmaker Richard Ayoade. Fox's uncles are actor Edward Fox and producer Robert Fox. He is also the cousin of actors Emilia and Freddie Fox, the children of his uncle Edward.

Fox was raised as an evangelical Christian. At the age of 13, he was enrolled at Harrow School and was expelled a few weeks before taking his A-Level exams. He was unable to obtain a place at any university due to a report about him from Harrow. After working as a gardener and in an office, he decided to follow his family into acting and successfully auditioned for the Royal Academy of Dramatic Art (RADA). During his time there, he appeared in numerous theatre productions, including the lead roles of Gregers Werle in Ibsen's The Wild Duck, Marcus Andronicus in Titus Andronicus, and Stephen Daedalus in an adaptation of James Joyce's novel Ulysses. He graduated in 2001.

Acting career
Fox made his acting debut in the horror-thriller film The Hole (2001). He next appeared in Robert Altman's film Gosford Park (2001). He then donned uniforms in a slew of film and television features, including roles as a German airman in Island at War (2004), an SS officer in The Last Drop (2005), and as British soldiers in the 2002 films Deathwatch and Ultimate Force, and in Colditz (2005). In the last made-for-television film, Fox played Capt. Tom Willis who, after an unsuccessful attempt to break out of a prisoner-of-war camp, is brought to Oflag IV-C in Colditz Castle, one of the most infamous German POW camps for officers in World War II. Actor Kevin Whately caught Fox's performance in the last ten minutes of the film. The next day, at a meeting regarding a new project, Whately mentioned that Fox "would be worth taking a look at".

As a result, Fox was cast in the ITV detective drama Lewis as Detective Sergeant James Hathaway, who becomes the partner of Detective Inspector Robert Lewis, played by Whately. The pilot of this spin-off from Inspector Morse (1987–2000) was ITV's highest-rated drama of 2006.

Fox has also portrayed Prince Charles, in Whatever Love Means (2005); Wisley, one of Jane Austen's suitors, in Becoming Jane (2007); and Sir Christopher Hatton, the Lord Chancellor of England in Elizabeth: The Golden Age, also released in 2007. In addition, in that year Fox was seen on ITV as Cecil Vyse in Andrew Davies's adaptation of A Room with a View based on E.M. Forster's 1908 novel.

On stage, Fox appeared in Mrs. Warren's Profession by George Bernard Shaw at the Strand Theatre (now the Novello Theatre) in London in 2002, and John Ford's 17th-century play 'Tis Pity She's a Whore in 2005. Between 2006 and 2007 he starred in Treats by Christopher Hampton with his future wife, Billie Piper. In April 2007, Fox received a police caution after he was arrested for assault when he punched a photographer outside the Garrick Theatre in London where he was performing in Treats. The caution remained on his record for three years. In 2013, Fox played Guy Haines in Strangers on a Train at London's Gielgud Theatre. On 9 May 2015, he read a letter written by a soldier three days prior to his death in the Second World War, as part of VE Day 70: A Party to Remember, an anniversary concert for VE Day.

Fox released his debut album Holding Patterns in 2016 through his own label Fox Cub Records. His second album A Grief Observed was released in 2019. Holding Patterns peaked at number 89 in the UK album chart.

In 2018, Fox joined the cast of the ITV series Victoria, playing Lord Palmerston, for its third season, which first aired on PBS in January 2019.

In November 2020, Fox was dropped by his talent agency Artists Rights Group after claiming on Question Time that an audience member's description of him as a "white privileged male" was "racist". He had been dropped by his previous managers Authentic Talent earlier in the year.

In 2021, Fox portrayed Hunter Biden in conservative filmmaker Robert Davi's biopic My Son Hunter, notably starring alongside fellow conservatives Gina Carano and John James, the former of whom was also dropped by her agent after spreading some of the same right-wing conspiracy theories as Fox. The film was distributed by far-right website Breitbart News.

Views

Political correctness
In 2019, Fox told The Times that YouTube videos had "totally radicalised" him against "woke culture" and "political correctness".

COVID-19
During the COVID-19 pandemic, Fox frequently criticised the British government's response to the pandemic and encouraged people to break the government's social distancing rules and disobey other public health restrictions. During an interview on Good Morning Britain, he said that "if the NHS can't cope, then the NHS isn't fit for purpose". The show's hosts, Piers Morgan and Susanna Reid, condemned his comments. During a national lockdown in March 2021, he participated in an anti-lockdown protest. He was also visited by police after being reported for allegedly breaking rules during his election campaign, although no action was taken.

Racial issues 
Appearing as a panellist on the BBC's political debate programme Question Time in January 2020, Fox said that Meghan Markle was not a victim of racism and described an audience member who called him a "white privileged male" as racist. The British actors' union Equity called him "a disgrace to our industry" for his views, but withdrew its criticism and apologised two months later.

In January 2020, Fox attracted media attention for stating that the depiction of a Sikh soldier in the film 1917 was "forced diversity" in spite of Sikh soldiers having fought on the Western Front in World War I. When interviewed, he explained, "I suppose it would have been less incongruous to me if he'd got on the truck to a whole regiment of Sikh soldiers. [...] I mean, as you've noticed, I say quite a lot of unfortunate things, but I think it's really important that one is able to express one's opinion." He followed by apologising on Twitter to "fellow humans who are Sikhs" and wrote, "I am as moved by the sacrifices your relatives made as I am by the loss of all those who die in war, whatever creed or colour. Please accept my apology for being clumsy in the way I expressed myself."

In September 2020, Fox said that he had been "cancelled" by his Lewis co-star Rebecca Front because she had blocked him on Twitter over his use of the All Lives Matter counter-slogan in response to the Black Lives Matter movement. He later apologised for revealing this information by posting private text messages between the two, in which Front told him why she blocked him.

In August 2021, Fox posted a tweet stating "get kneeling, fuckers" about the recent arrest of black footballer Benjamin Mendy on charges of rape and sexual assault. The tweet was removed by Twitter and the account was temporarily locked for violating its rules against "hateful conduct".

Views on progress pride flag 
In June 2022 Fox tweeted an image of a swastika made from the LGBTQ+ Progress Pride flag with the caption, "You can openly call the [Union Jack] a symbol of fa[s]cism and totalitarianism on Twatter. You cannot criticise the holy flags." This led to him being suspended from Twitter for a day. His actions were publicly condemned by the Holocaust Memorial Day Trust and the Campaign Against Antisemitism.

Political ambitions

Reclaim Party

In September 2020, Fox attracted funding for a new political party, provisionally called Reclaim, and dubbed "UKIP for culture".  It emerged in October 2020 that the party name had yet to be successfully registered with the Electoral Commission and that there was a naming conflict with the "Reclaim Project" of Manchester, an established charity in Manchester endeavouring to give opportunities to working-class children. The name Reclaim Party was approved in February 2021 as an identity mark for Brexit Express.

2021 candidacy for London mayor 
In March 2021, Fox announced he would stand in the London mayoral elections, in order to "fight against extreme political correctness" and pledging to "end the Met's obsession with diversity and inclusivity."  His candidacy was endorsed by Reform UK, who stood aside for him in the election, and Nigel Farage. In mid-April 2021 Fox was polling at around 1%, tied with Count Binface. The major source of Fox's campaign funds was Brexit backer Jeremy Hosking, who, in the first quarter of 2021, gave the Reclaim Party more than £1,000,000 in cash and services. Fox finished in sixth place with 47,634 votes (1.9%) in the mayoral election. He lost his £10,000 election deposit.

Legal issues

Defamation lawsuit 
In October 2020, Fox announced he would boycott Sainsbury's because they "support racial segregation and discrimination" referencing the store establishing safe spaces for black employees, while asking others to do the same. Sainsbury's later clarified that the safe spaces were online support groups established in response to Black Lives Matter and were promoted as part of support for Black History Month. Feeling he was "falsely smeared as a racist", Fox replied to a number of tweets reacting to that announcement by calling their authors paedophiles. Two of those people, RuPaul's Drag Race UK contestant Crystal and Simon Blake, deputy chair of the LGBT rights charity Stonewall, both gay men, later announced they would sue Fox for defamation. Fox deleted the tweets and explained in further tweets that he wanted to teach people a lesson in calling people something which they are not.

In April 2021, Crystal and Blake lodged a claim for defamation in the High Court  and were joined in the legal action by actress Nicola Thorp, whom Fox also called a paedophile. In response, Fox filed a countersuit over the accusations of racism.

In April 2022, Fox requested a jury trial and claimed that "a judge could show involuntary bias". Court documents revealed that this request cost Fox legal fees of more than £116,000. In May 2022 the request was refused. Later that month the High Court ruled that Fox must pay more than £36,000 in legal fees to Crystal, Blake and Thorp.

Personal life
Fox met actress Billie Piper while they were performing together in the play Treats in 2006. They started dating soon after, and were married on 31 December 2007. They had two sons together, Winston (born 2008) and Eugene (born 2012), before divorcing in May 2016.

In an October 2012 Independent interview, Fox described himself as a "vaguely lapsed Christian" who occasionally prays and thinks "the world is a better place for people who believe in God" despite not having "squared that circle" himself.

On 10 January 2022, Fox's engagement to Arabella Neagle was announced in The Daily Telegraph.

Filmography

Film

Television

Theatre

Some information in this table was obtained from the following websites: ; .

Discography
Albums

Holding Patterns (2016)
A Grief Observed (2019)

Singles/EPs
"Gunfight" (2012)
"So Be Damned" (2013)
Sorry for My Words EP (2013)
"Headlong" (2015)
"Rise Again" (2016)

References

External links

 – official site

Laurence Fox at Hello!

1978 births
Living people
Male actors from Leeds
Alumni of RADA
English male film actors
English male stage actors
English male television actors
People educated at Harrow School
Male actors from Yorkshire
Robin Fox family
21st-century English male actors
British political party founders
Leaders of political parties in the United Kingdom